The Ahr is a river in South Tyrol, Italy, which flows through the Tauferer Ahrntal.

References 
 Information about the Ahr in German and Italian.

External links

Rivers of Italy
Rivers of South Tyrol
Rieserferner-Ahrn Nature Park